

Qualification system
A total of 150 wrestlers will qualify to compete at the games. The winner of each weight category 2014 South American Games, 2014 Pan American Championships and 2014 Central American and Caribbean Games will qualify for the Games. The top five in the 2015 Pan American Championship also qualify. The host country (Canada) is guaranteed a spot in each event, but its athletes must compete in both the 2014 and 2015 Pan American Championships. A further six invitational slots (four men and two women) will be awarded to nations without any qualified athlete but took part in the qualification tournaments. All countries qualifying an athlete in a tournament in 2014 will be required to compete in the 2015 Pan American Championship, failure to do so will mean the forfeiting of the quota. Any unused quota spots will be reallocated to the next best country not qualified at the 2015 Pan Am Championship.

Qualification timeline

Qualification summary

Men's freestyle events

57 kg

65 kg

74 kg

86 kg

97 kg

125 kg

Men's Greco-Roman events

59 kg

66 kg 

Canada did not compete in this weight category at the 2014 Pan American Championship and thus lost its host nation spot.

75 kg 

Canada did not compete in this weight category at the 2014 Pan American Championship and thus lost its host nation spot.

85 kg

98 kg

130 kg 

Canada did not compete in this weight category at the 2014 Pan American Championship and thus lost its host nation spot. However, its athlete qualified later at the 2015 Pan American Championship.

Women's freestyle events

48 kg

53 kg

58 kg

This event was not held at the 2014 South American Games

63 kg

69 kg

75 kg

References

P
P
Qualification for the 2015 Pan American Games
Wrestling at the 2015 Pan American Games